Kumarapediya is a town located in the North Western Province of Sri Lanka at an altitude of 148 metres (488 feet).

Populated places in North Western Province, Sri Lanka